The Apostolic Nunciature to Angola is an ecclesiastical office of the Roman Catholic Church in Angola. It is a diplomatic post of the Holy See, whose representative is called the Apostolic Nuncio with the rank of an ambassador. The Holy See has full diplomatic ties with Angola as well as most other countries.

Nuncios
Giovanni De Andrea (14 April 1975 - 26 January 1983)
Fortunato Baldelli (12 February 1983 - 20 April 1991)
Félix del Blanco Prieto (31 May 1991 - 4 May 1996)
Aldo Cavalli (2 July 1996 - 28 June 2001)
Giovanni Angelo Becciu (15 October 2001 - 23 July 2009)
Novatus Rugambwa (20 February 2010 - 5 March 2015)
Petar Rajič (15 June 2015 – 15 June 2019)
Giovanni Gaspari (21 September 2020 – present)

See also
 Apostolic Nunciature
 Foreign relations of the Holy See
 List of diplomatic missions of the Holy See
 Roman Catholicism in Angola

References

 
Angola
Angola–Holy See relations